The Faculty of Dentistry was established in 1945 as The School of Dentistry as part of the Faculty of Medicine of Alexandria University in 1945/1946 with only two students.

The Faculty of Dentistry was officially founded independently in 1970.

Notable alumni
 Samir Bishara

See also 
 Educational institutions in Alexandria

References 

Alexandria University
Educational institutions established in 1970
1970 establishments in Egypt